Cadu may refer to:
Place
Cadu River
People
Cadu may refer to people with the given name Ricardo, or a shortened form of Carlos Eduardo:
Cadu (footballer, born 1974) (Ricardo Frederico Rodrigues Antunes), Brazilian footballer
Cadú (footballer, born 1981) (Ricardo Manuel Ferreira Sousa), Portuguese footballer
Cadu (footballer, born 1982) (Carlos Eduardo Castro da Silva), Brazilian footballer
Cadú (footballer, born 1986) (Carlos Eduardo de Fiori Mendes), Brazilian footballer
Cadu (footballer, born 1997) (Carlos Eduardo Lopes Cruz), Brazilian footballer